Agelaea is a genus of beetles in the family Carabidae, containing the following species:

 Agelaea fulva Gene, 1839
 Agelaea himalayica Jedlicka, 1965

References

Platyninae